Medyka is a village in Przemyśl County, Subcarpathian Voivodeship, in south-eastern Poland, on the border with Ukraine. It is the seat of the municipality (gmina) called Gmina Medyka.

In 2006 the village had a population of approximately 2,800.

History
The village dates back to the Middle Ages. A castle existed there already in the 14th century. It was expanded in 1542 by Piotr Kmita Sobieński (1477-1553) Starosta of Przemyśl. In 1607 the Roman Catholic St Peter and Paul timber church was erected and in 1663 the settlement was granted Starostwo status. There was also a Greek Catholic Church. Medyka was occupied by Habsburg Austria after the Partitions of Poland in 1772 and remained within Galicia until the end of World War I. 

From 1809 the village became the property of the Pawlikowski family. They built a manor house on the ruins of the ancient castle and for generations maintained in their family seat a cultural centre with a valuable library and historical collections. In 1830  (1793-1852) established on his estate the first school of  horticulture in the Kingdom of Galicia and Lodomeria and a dendrological collection in his laid out park. The manor house was damaged both in 1915 and 1939 Fortuitously, part of its cultural heritage was donated to what became the Ossolineum Institute in Wrocław and survived. It includes a single page containing a Polish version of Psalm 50, known as the Karta medycka, from the early 15th century, discovered in Medyka in 1832 by historian and collector,  (1793-1855). 
 
The Polish 23rd Observation Escadrille was stationed in Medyka during the joint German-Soviet invasion of Poland, which started World War II in September 1939. Afterwards the village was occupied by the Soviet Union until 1941, under which it was annexed to the newly formed Drohobych Oblast of the Ukrainian SSR. From 1941, it was occupied by Nazi Germany, and from 1944 by the Soviet Union. It was eventually restored to Poland in 1948 during a revision of borders.

The British society portrait painter and illustrator, Aniela Pawlikowska, was married to the last proprietor of Medyka,  (1887-1970), a bibliophile, writer, and publisher who lived, worked and raised their family there, before being routed from their home by invading forces in World War II. They eventually settled in the United Kingdom.

Synagogue 
A brick-built rectangular synagogue,  was erected in the village at the beginning of the 20th century. As its congregation, it was devastated by Nazi invaders during World War II.

Border crossing
Medyka is one of the main road border crossings between Poland and Ukraine, along with a major railway line running through the village, connecting both countries. The village across the border in Ukraine is Shehyni. During the 2022 Russian invasion of Ukraine, Medyka is one site welcoming Ukrainian refugees who crossed the border.

Gallery

See also

 Krościenko, Bieszczady County

References

Poland–Ukraine border crossings
Villages in Przemyśl County